Trunding is a coastal residential locality in the Weipa Town, Queensland, Australia.

Geography 
Albatross Bay is off-shore to the west. with Nanum Beach extending from Nanum to Trunding. Albatross Bay is part of the Gulf of Carpentaria. 

The land in the north-west of Trunding is used for residential housing while the remainder of the locality is undeveloped.

History 
The locality is believed to takes its name from Trunding Creek (possibly originally called Trundling Creek).

Education 
There are no schools in Trunding. The nearest government primary and secondary school is Western Cape College in neighbouring Rocky Point to the north-east.

References 

Weipa Town
Coastline of Queensland
Localities in Queensland